Amperea is a plant species of the family Euphorbiaceae first described as a genus in 1824. The  entire genus is endemic to Australia.

Species

References

Euphorbiaceae genera
Acalyphoideae
Endemic flora of Australia